Hary or Háry may refer to the following people
Given name
Hary Suharyadi (born 1965), Indonesian tennis player 
Hary Susanto (born 1975), Indonesian para badminton player 
Hary Tanoesoedibjo (born 1965), Indonesian businessman 

Surname
Armin Hary (born 1937), German sprinter
László Háry (1890–1953), Commander of the Hungarian Air Force
Maryan Hary (born 1980), French road bicycle racer

Indonesian masculine given names